The 2022–23 Liga TDP season is the fourth-tier football league of Mexico. The tournament will begin on 18 August 2022 and will finish on June 2023.

Competition format 
The Tercera División (Third Division) is divided into 18 groups. For the 2009–2010 season, the format of the tournament has been reorganized to a home and away format, which all teams will play in their respective group. The 18 groups consist of teams which are eligible to play in the liguilla de ascenso (promotion play–offs) for four promotion spots, teams who are affiliated with teams in the Liga MX, Liga de Expansión MX and Liga Premier and development teams, which are not eligible for promotion but will play that who the better team in a sixteen team reserves playoff tournament for the entire season.

The regulation awards three points for a win, one point for a tie and zero points for a loss, however, when a match ends tied, a penalty shoot-out is played to award a bonus point to the winning team of the penalty series.

The league format allows participating franchises to rent their place to another team, so some clubs compete with a different name than the one registered with the FMF.

For the 2022–23 season there will be four promotions to the Liga Premier. Two to Serie A and two to Serie B.

Group 1
Group with 13 teams from Campeche, Chiapas Quintana Roo and Yucatán.

Teams

League table

Group 2
Group with 11 teams from Chiapas and Oaxaca.

Teams

League table

Group 3
Group with 13 teams from Puebla and Veracruz.

Teams

League table

Group 4
Group with 16 teams from Greater Mexico City.

Teams

League table

Group 5
Group with 16 teams from Greater Mexico City.

Teams

League table

Group 6
Group with 16 teams from Hidalgo, Michoacán and State of Mexico.

Teams

League table

Group 7
Group with 14 teams from Guerrero, Mexico City and Morelos.

Teams

League table

Group 8
Group with 16 teams from Hidalgo and State of Mexico.

Teams

League table

Group 9
Group with 10 teams from Hidalgo, Puebla, San Luis Potosí and Veracruz.

Teams

League table

Group 10
Group with 13 teams from Guanajuato and Querétaro.

{{Location map+ |Mexico Querétaro |width=450|float=right |caption=Location of teams in the 2022–23 Liga TDP Group 10 (Querétaro)|places=

Teams

League table

Group 11
Group with 9 teams from Guanajuato and Michoacán.

Teams

League table

Group 12
Group with 12 teams from Aguascalientes, Guanajuato, Jalisco, San Luis Potosí and Zacatecas.

Teams
{{Location map+ |Mexico Guanajuato |width=300|float=right |caption=Location of teams in the 2022–23 Liga TDP Group 12 (Guanajuato and Jalisco)|places=

League table

Group 13
Group with 12 teams from Jalisco.

Teams
{{Location map+ |Mexico Jalisco |width=500|float=right |caption=Location of teams in the 2022–23 Liga TDP Group 13 |places=

League table

Group 14
Group with 12 teams from Colima and Jalisco.

Teams
{{Location map+ |Mexico Jalisco |width=500|float=right |caption=Location of teams in the 2022–23 Liga TDP Group 14 |places=

League table

Group 15
Group with 12 teams from Jalisco, Nayarit and Sinaloa.

Teams

League table

Group 16
Group with 16 teams from Coahuila, Nuevo León and Tamaulipas.

Teams
{{Location map+ |Mexico Nuevo León |width=300|float=right |caption=Location of teams in the 2022–23 Liga TDP Group 16 (Nuevo León)|places=

League table

Group 17
Group with 11 teams from Baja California, Chihuahua and Sonora.

Teams

League table

Group 18
Group with 5 teams from Baja California.

Teams

League table

Promotion Play–offs
The Promotion Play–offs will consist of seven phases. Classify 64 teams, the number varies according to the number of teams in each group, being between three and eight clubs per group. The country will be divided into two zones: South Zone (Groups 1 to 8) and North Zone (Groups 9 to 18). Eliminations will be held according to the average obtained by each team, being ordered from best to worst by their percentage throughout the season.

As of 2020–21 season, the names of the knockout stages were modified as follows: Round of 32, Round of 16, Quarter-finals, Semifinals, Zone Final and Final, this as a consequence of the division of the country into two zones, for so the teams only face clubs from the same region until the final series.

Reserve and Development Teams
Each season a table is created among those teams that don't have the right to promote, because they are considered as reserve teams for teams that play in Liga MX, Liga de Expansión and Liga Premier or are independent teams that have requested not to participate for the Promotion due to the fact that they are footballers development projects. The ranking order is determined through the "quotient", which is obtained by dividing the points obtained between the disputed matches, being ordered from highest to lowest.

Table 

Last updated: March 15, 2023 Source: Liga TDPP = Position; G = Games played; Pts = Points; Pts/G = Ratio of points to games played; GD = Goal difference 

 (Q) Qualified to play–offs

Regular Season statistics

Top goalscorers 
Players sorted first by goals scored, then by last name.

Source:Liga TDP

References

External links
 Official website of Liga TDP

1